The following is a list of all IFT-licensed over-the-air television stations broadcasting in the Mexican state of Tabasco. There are 16 television stations in Tabasco.

List of television stations

|-

|-

|-

|-

|-

|-

|-

|-

|-

|-

|-

|-

|-

|-

|-

References

Television stations in Tabasco
Tabasco